Greenway is a surname. Notable people with the surname include:

For members of the Lauder Greenway family

John Campbell Greenway (1872–1926), General, U.S. Army and Mining Magnate
Isabella Greenway (1886–1953), U.S. Congresswoman
G. Lauder Greenway (1904 - 1981), Chairman, Metropolitan Opera Association
James Greenway (1903–1989), American ornithologist and Curator of the Museum of Comparative Zoology at Harvard
H.D.S. Greenway, (b. 1935), American war correspondent, newspaper editor

Others
Barney Greenway (born 1969), British death metal vocalist
Brian Greenway (born 1951), Canadian guitarist and vocalist
Chad Greenway (born 1983), American football player
Charles Greenway, 1st Baron Greenway (1857-1934), British businessman
Diana Greenway (born 1937), British historian and academic
Francis Greenway (1777–1837), Australian architect
Harry Greenway (born 1934), British politician
John Greenway (folklorist) (1919-1991)
John Greenway (MP) (born 1946), British Conservative politician
Jordan Greenway (born 1997), American ice hockey player
Thomas Greenway (1838–1908), Premier of Manitoba, Canada
Thomas John Greenway, mining metallurgist in Australia
Tom Greenway, Canadian judoka